The 1848 United States presidential election in Ohio was held on November 7, 1848 as part of the 1848 United States presidential election. State voters chose twenty-three electors to the Electoral College, who voted for President and Vice President.

Ohio voted for the Democratic Party candidate, Lewis Cass, who won the state with a plurality of 47.12% of the popular vote. The Whig Party candidate, Zachary Taylor, garnered 42.12% of the popular vote. This is the only election where the Democratic candidate won Ohio but lost the general election, as well as the most recent election where Ohio voted for a losing Presidential candidate in consecutive elections.

Results

See also
 United States presidential elections in Ohio

References

Ohio
1848
1848 Ohio elections